Melipeuco is a town and commune in Chile, located at the foot of the Andes, in the Province of Cautín, Araucanía Region. The Nevados de Sollipulli, an ice-filled volcanic caldera surrounded by numerous hot water springs and geysers, lie south of the town. Lake Carilafquén is also located in this area.

Demographics
Of these, 2,333 (41.5%) lived in urban areas and 3,295 (58.5%) in rural areas. The population grew by 5.9% (315 persons) between the 1992 and 2002 censuses.

Administration
As a commune, Melipeuco is a third-level administrative division of Chile administered by a municipal council, headed by an alcalde who is directly elected every four years. The 2008-2012 alcalde is Eduardo Navarrete Fuentes (UDI).

Within the electoral divisions of Chile, Melipeuco is represented in the Chamber of Deputies by Enrique Estay (UDI) and Fuad Chahín (PDC) as part of the 49th electoral district, together with Victoria, Curacautín, Lonquimay, Vilcún, Lautaro, Perquenco and Galvarino. The commune is represented in the Senate by Alberto Espina Otero (RN) and Jaime Quintana Leal (PPD) as part of the 14th senatorial constituency (Araucanía-North).

View

References

External links
  Municipality of Melipeuco

Communes of Chile
Populated places established in 1981
Populated places in Cautín Province